The Winnipeg Blue Bombers are a professional Canadian football team based in Winnipeg, Manitoba, and are members of the West Division in the Canadian Football League (CFL). The club was founded in 1930 as the Winnipeg Rugby Club and began as a member of the Manitoba Rugby Football Union. They were a founding member of the CFL when it was formed in 1958. The current Blue Bombers head coach position is held by Mike O'Shea. The general manager is Kyle Walters and the president and chief executive officer for the community-owned team is Wade Miller.

Key

Head coaches
Note: Statistics are current through the end of the 2022 CFL season.

Notes
 A running total of the number of coaches of the Blue Bombers. Thus, any coach who has two or more separate terms as head coach is only counted once.
 Each year is linked to an article about that particular CFL season.

References
General

Specific

Lists of Canadian Football League head coaches by team

Winnipeg Blue Bombers lists